Battle of Rhodes can refer to several battles and sieges throughout history.
 Siege of Rhodes (305–304 BC), by Demetrius I of Macedon
 Hospitaller conquest of Rhodes (1306–1310)
 Siege of Rhodes (1444), unsuccessful attempt by the Mamluks under Aynal Gecut to expel the Knights Hospitaller from the island
 Siege of Rhodes (1480), first, unsuccessful attempt by the Ottoman Empire to expel the Knights Hospitaller from the island
 Siege of Rhodes (1522), second, successful attempt by the Ottoman Empire to expel the Knights Hospitaller from the island
 Battle of Rhodes (1912), Italian capture of the island during the Italo-Turkish War
 Battle of Rhodes (1943), German invasion during World War II.